Raiske is a village in Kramatorsk Raion of Donetsk Oblast, Ukraine.

Until 18 July 2020, Raiske was located in Kostiantynivka Raion. The raion was abolished that day as part of the administrative reform of Ukraine, the number of raions of Donetsk Oblast was reduced to eight, of which only five were controlled by the government. Kostiantynivka Raion was merged into Kramatorsk Raion.

References

Villages in Kramatorsk Raion